is a former Japanese football player.

Playing career
Yamada was born in Fukuoka Prefecture on November 4, 1981. He joined J1 League club Avispa Fukuoka from youth team in 2000. However he could not play at all in the match until 2001 and the club was relegated to J2 League end of 2001 season. Although he debuted in 2002, he could not play many matches until 2003. In 2004, he moved to Japan Football League club Otsuka Pharmaceutical. Although the club won the champions and was promoted to J2 from 2004, he could not play many matches in 2004 and retired end of 2004 season.

Club statistics

References

External links

1981 births
Living people
Association football people from Fukuoka Prefecture
Japanese footballers
J1 League players
J2 League players
Japan Football League players
Avispa Fukuoka players
Tokushima Vortis players
Association football midfielders